Sadat Dalpari (also Romanized as Sādāt Dālparī; also known as Dālparī, Dāl Parī, and Seyyed Yūsefī) is a village in Nahr-e Anbar Rural District, Musian District, Dehloran County, Ilam Province, Iran. At the 2006 census, its population was 390, in 60 families. The village is populated by Arabs.

References 

Populated places in Dehloran County
Arab settlements in llam Province